Annie Choong (born 20 February 1934) is a Malaysian sprinter. She competed in the women's 100 metres at the 1956 Summer Olympics. She was the first woman to represent Malaysia at the Olympics.

References

External links
 

1934 births
Living people
Athletes (track and field) at the 1956 Summer Olympics
Malaysian female sprinters
Olympic athletes of Malaya
Place of birth missing (living people)
Olympic female sprinters